Creeping pine may refer to several conifer species:

 Actinostrobus acuminatus, Australian, in family Cupressaceae
 Pinus albicaulis, North American, in family Pinaceae
 Pinus mugo, native to high places in Central Europe, in family Pinaceae
 Pinus pumila, Asian, in family Pinaceae
 Microcachrys, Australian, in family Podocarpaceae

See also
Ground pine or Lycopodium
Creeping juniper or Juniperus horizontalis
Creeping spruce, a cultivar of  Picea abies